Aphanobelodon is an extinct genus of proboscidean in the family Amebelodontidae.

Taxonomy
The holotype is the complete cranium of an adult female, and the paratypes include the remains of another adult female, an adult male, four subadults, and three calves. It is one of the few proboscidean species that lacks upper tusks, a trait previously thought to be unique to deinotheres. 

The generic name comes from aphano, meaning invisible, and belodon, meaning front tooth. The specific name of the type species is after Rong Zhao, who discovered and excavated the specimens.

References

Amebelodontidae
Miocene proboscideans
Miocene mammals of Asia
Prehistoric elephants
Prehistoric placental genera
Fossil taxa described in 2016